Ponnur Municipality is the local self government in Ponnur, a town in the Indian state of Andhra Pradesh. It is classified as a Grade–II municipality.

History 
The municipality was constituted in the year 1964 as Grade–III and then got upgraded in the year 1984 as a Grade–II municipality.

Administration 
The Elected Wing of the municipality consists of a municipal council, which has elected members and is headed by a Chairperson. Whereas, the  Executive Wing is headed by a municipal commissioner. The present chairperson of the municipality is Sajja Hemalatha and the present commissioner is M.Ramesh Babu.

As per the survey conducted in 2014, there exists 60,600 households.

Civic works and services 
The municipality supplies drinking and irrigation water to the town from the Kommamuru, Poondla and Alwala channels of Krishna Western Delta system. by means of borewells, public taps and water treatment plants. A total of 9 MLD (million liters per day) of drinking water is supplied every day.

The other infrastructure covers street lights, markets, and burial grounds, and recreational centers like, parks, playgrounds, auditoriums, functional halls and worship centers like temples, mosques and churches. There are both government and private educational institutions from primary to high schools including junior colleges. For public health, the municipality has a Government hospital and many other government and private nursing homes.

See also 
 List of municipalities in Andhra Pradesh

References 

1964 establishments in Andhra Pradesh
Government agencies established in 1964
Urban local bodies in Andhra Pradesh